Priocnemis minorata is a species of spider wasp in the family Pompilidae.

References

Further reading

External links

 

Pepsinae
Insects described in 1912